Point Mills is an unincorporated community in Ohio County, West Virginia, United States. Point Mills lies along the National Road (U.S. Route 40) and is incorporated into the Village of Valley Grove. It is part of the Wheeling, West Virginia Metropolitan Statistical Area.

References

Unincorporated communities in Ohio County, West Virginia
National Road
Unincorporated communities in West Virginia